The Flying Tigers was the nickname of the 1st American Volunteer Group, a unit of the Chinese Air Force in 1941–1942 composed of volunteer pilots from the United States.

Flying Tigers may also refer to:

Businesses
 Flying Tiger Line, a cargo airline
 Flying Tiger Copenhagen, a Danish retailer chain

Entertainment
 Flying Tigers (film), a 1942 movie starring John Wayne
 Flying Tiger (DC Comics), a DC comics character
 Flying Tiger (Marvel Comics), a comic-book character
 Flying Tigers (album), a 2011 album by heavy metal band White Wizzard
 Flying Tigers, a fictional team of pilots in the comic series Buck Danny
 Flying Tigers (game), a 1969 board wargame of aerial combat
 Flying Tigers: Shadows Over China, a 2017 video game
Flying Tiger 2, a 2019 crime drama television series
 Baa Baa Black Sheep, an American TV series translated into Spanish as Los Tigres Voladores (The Flying Tigers)

Law enforcement
 Special Duties Unit, tactical unit of the Hong Kong Police Force
 Helicopter Unit, Beijing Special Weapons and Tactics Unit, Ministry of Public Security of the People's Republic of China

Military units
 23d Fighter Group, a United States Air Force unit which absorbed the 1st AVG
 2/229th Aviation Regiment "Flying Tigers", United States Army
 HMH-361 (Marine Heavy Helicopter Squadron 361), United States Marine Corps
 HMM-262 (Medium Helicopter Squadron 262), United States Marine Corps
 102 Squadron (Israel), Israeli Air Force
 814 Naval Air Squadron, Royal Navy Fleet Air Arm
 Flying Tigers Freefall Parachute Display Team, based in north Germany

Sports
 Xinjiang Flying Tigers, a professional basketball team based in Ürümqi, Xinjiang, China
 Yunnan Flying Tigers F.C., a professional football club based in Lijiang, Yunnan, China
 Lakeland Flying Tigers, a minor league affiliate of the Detroit Tigers in Lakeland, Florida, United States
 Hagersville RCAF Flying Tigers, a team in the Ontario Armed Services Football League - see 1944 in Canadian football